The artery of bulb of vestibule (artery of the vestibule bulb) is a branch of the internal pudendal artery. It supplies the vestibular bulbs and thus only exist in females.

References

External links
  - "The Female Perineum: The Deep Perineal Pouch"

Arteries of the abdomen